Belarus competed at the 2013 Summer Universiade in Kazan, Russia from 6 July to 17 July 2013. 163 athletes are a part of the Belarusian team.

Belarus won 40 medals (7th place), including 13 gold medals (5th place), more than United States.

References

Nations at the 2013 Summer Universiade
Belarus at the Summer Universiade